Étienne Pardoux (born 1947) is a French mathematician working in the field of Stochastic analysis, in particular Stochastic partial differential equations. He is currently Professor at Aix-Marseille University.

He obtained his PhD in 1975 at University of Paris-Sud under the supervision of Alain Bensoussan and Roger Meyer Temam.

Together with Peng Shige, he founded the Theory of Backward Stochastic differential equations.

References

External links
 Aix-Marseille University faculty page

1947 births
Living people
French mathematicians
Academic staff of Aix-Marseille University